Dial is a ghost town in Covert Township, Osborne County, Kansas, United States.

History
Dial was located in the Covert Creek Valley in Osborne County. Dial was issued a post office in 1881. The post office was discontinued in 1903.  There is nothing left of Dial.

References

Former populated places in Osborne County, Kansas
Former populated places in Kansas